Campbelltown is an electoral district of the Legislative Assembly of the Australian state of New South Wales in Sydney's South-west. It includes the suburbs of Airds, Ambarvale, Blair Athol, Blairmount, Bradbury, Campbelltown, Claymore, Eagle Vale, Englorie Park, Gilead, Glen Alpine, Kentlyn, Leumeah, Menangle Park, Rosemeadow, Ruse, St Helens Park, Wedderburn and Woodbine.

It is represented by Greg Warren of the Labor Party.

Members for Campbelltown

Election results

2019

References

External links

Campbelltown